Arts College station may refer to:

Arts College railway station, a railway station in Secunderabad, Telangana, India
Arts College station (Hohhot Metro), a rapid transit station in Hohhot, Inner Mongolia, China

See also 
College station (disambiguation)